Taylor Field may refer to:
 Mosaic Stadium at Taylor Field, a defunct sports venue in Regina, Saskatchewan
 Taylor Field (Alabama), a former military airfield near Montgomery, Alabama
 Taylor Field (Florida), a former airport and military airfield near Ocala, Florida
 DeLand Municipal Airport or Sidney H. Taylor Field, an airport in DeLand, Florida
 Ocala International Airport or Jim Taylor Field, an airport in Ocala, Florida
 Taylor Field, Campbell University, a sport venue in Buies Creek, North Carolina
 Taylor Field (Pine Bluff, Arkansas), a baseball stadium